Jason Charles Phillips (born March 22, 1974) is a former pitcher in Major League Baseball who played between  and  for the Pittsburgh Pirates (1999) and Cleveland Indians (-2003). Phillips batted and threw right-handed.

In a three-season career, Phillips posted a 1–4 record with a 6.20 ERA, 32 strikeouts and 53 ⅔ innings in 50 games pitched, six as a starter. After his major league career, Phillips pitched parts of two seasons (2003-) in Japan for the Orix BlueWave.

External links

Retrosheet

Cleveland Indians players
Pittsburgh Pirates players
Major League Baseball pitchers
American expatriate baseball players in Japan
Orix BlueWave players
Baseball players from Pennsylvania
Carolina Mudcats players
Akron Aeros players
Buffalo Bisons (minor league) players
Nashville Sounds players
Durham Bulls players
1974 births
Living people
Gulf Coast Pirates players
Welland Pirates players
Augusta GreenJackets players
Lynchburg Hillcats players
Altoona Curve players
Montgomery Biscuits players
Hiroshima Toyo Carp players